Marko Janković (born 29 February 1976) is a Serbian sprinter. He competed in the men's 4 × 400 metres relay at the 2000 Summer Olympics, representing Yugoslavia.

References

1976 births
Living people
Athletes (track and field) at the 2000 Summer Olympics
Serbian male sprinters
Yugoslav male sprinters
Olympic athletes of Yugoslavia
Place of birth missing (living people)